Uropeltis beddomii, commonly known as Beddome's earth snake, is a species of snake in the family Uropeltidae. The species is endemic to India.

Etymology
U. beddomi is named after Richard Henry Beddome (1830–1911), British army officer and botanist.

Geographic range
U. beddomii is found in southern India (Anaimalai Hills).  The type locality is "Anamallay Hills".

Description
The dorsum of U. beddomii is brown, with a yellow streak on each side of the neck. A yellow crossband is at the base of the tail, but not on the sides of the tail. The ventrum is brown mixed with yellow.

The longest specimen in the type series collected by Col. Beddome is a female   in total length (including tail).

Dorsal scales are in 19 rows behind the head, and in 17 rows at midbody. Ventrals number 180-188; subcaudals number six or seven (females).

The snout is acutely pointed, strongly projecting. The rostral is strongly compressed, keeled above, the portion visible from above two fifths the length of the shielded part of the head. The nasals are in contact with each other behind the rostral. The frontal is longer than broad. The eye is very small, less than ½ the length of the ocular. The diameter of body goes 33 to 44 times in the total length. The ventrals are less than twice as large as the contiguous dorsal scales. The end of the tail is subtruncate, convex, or somewhat flattened dorsally, the scales with 3 to 5 strong keels. The terminal scute has a transverse ridge and two points.

Reproduction
U. beddomii is viviparous.

References

Further reading

Beddome RH (1864). "Descriptions of New Species of the Family Uropeltidæ from Southern India, with Notes on other little-known Species". Annals and Magazine of Natural History, Third Series 13: 177-180. (Silybura beddomii, p. 179).
Günther A (1862). "On new Species of Snakes in the Collection of the British Museum". Ann. Mag. Nat. Hist., Third Series  9: 52-59 + Plates IX & X. (Silybura beddomii, new species, pp. 56–57).
Günther ACLG (1864). The Reptiles of British India. London: The Ray Society. (Taylor and Francis, printers). xxvii + 452 pp. + Plates I–XXVI. (Silybura beddomii, p. 190 + Plate XVII, figure F [two views of head]).
Sharma RC (2003). Handbook: Indian Snakes. Kolkata: Zoological Survey of India. 292 pp. .
Smith MA (1943). The Fauna of British India, Ceylon and Burma, Including the Whole of the Indo-Chinese Sub-region. Reptilia and Amphibia. Vol. III.—Serpentes. London: Secretary of State for India. (Taylor and Francis, printers). xii + 583 pp. ("Uropeltis beddomei [sic]", p. 78).
Whitaker R, Captain A (2008). Snakes of India: The Field Guide. Chennai: Draco Books. 495 pp. .

Uropeltidae
Reptiles of India
Endemic fauna of the Western Ghats
Reptiles described in 1862
Taxa named by Albert Günther